This is a list of visitors of the constituent colleges of the University of Oxford. Three of the university's 39 colleges, Kellogg College, Reuben College and St Cross College, do not have visitors, as they are societies of the university rather than independent colleges with a royal charter.

Notes

References 

Visitors